G2A may refer to:

 G2A - a video games website.
 LNWR Class G2A
 Haplogroup G2a
 A version of the Soko G-2 Galeb
 A G protein-coupled receptor that is also termed GPR132